Nathan P. Small is an American politician serving as a member of the New Mexico House of Representatives from the 36th district.

Education 
Small earned a Bachelor of Arts degree in English and philosophy from the College of Wooster.

Career 
Small was previously a member of the Las Cruces, New Mexico City Council. He was elected to the New Mexico House for District 36 in 2016. He filed for reelection in 2018, winning with 59.9% of the general election vote.

Personal life 

References

External links

Living people
People from Las Cruces, New Mexico
College of Wooster alumni
Democratic Party members of the New Mexico House of Representatives
New Mexico city council members
21st-century American politicians
Year of birth missing (living people)